Christelyn Karazin is an American writer, columnist, and blogger on the subject of interracial dating, particularly black women dating outside their race. She hosts the blog "Beyond Black & White" and has written for Woman's Day, Ebony, Jet, and Reuters.

Biography
Karazin attended Loyola Marymount University, where she wrote for The Los Angeles Loyolan.

Karazin founded the "No Wedding, No Womb" initiative in the summer of 2010, after her eldest daughter asked why Karazin had not married her father. Realizing that this was a question that many children may ask single parents, Karazin launched "No Wedding, No Womb", which promotes the idea that couples should "abstain from having children until they are emotionally, physically and financially able to care for them."

Karazin also founded the "Pink Pill" a private community and self-improvement course for Black Women, and is part of the "Beyond Black and White" Website. It provides women with "Strategies for Living Well to the Extreme" this course has received many supporters and praises.

In 2013, Karazin launched the blogger network SheThrives and in the following year she served as the host for the dating reality web series Swirlr.

Publications
Swirling: How to Date, Mate, and Relate Mixing Race, Culture, and Creed (2012, with Janice Rhoshalle Littlejohn)

References

External links
 Beyond Black & White

Living people
American bloggers
American women bloggers
American columnists
American women columnists
African-American activists
Year of birth missing (living people)
American women non-fiction writers
21st-century American non-fiction writers
21st-century American women writers
21st-century African-American women writers
21st-century African-American writers